Lamar County (formerly Jones County and Sanford County) is a county in the U.S. state of Alabama. As of the 2020 census, the population was 13,972. Its county seat is Vernon and it is a dry county. It is named in honor of Lucius Quintus Cincinnatus Lamar, a former member of both houses of the United States Congress from Mississippi.

History
Jones County, Alabama was established on February 4, 1867, with land taken from the southern part of Marion County and the western part of Fayette County. It was named for E. P. Jones of Fayette County, with its county seat in Vernon.  This county was abolished on November 13, 1867.  On October 8, 1868, the area was again organized into a county, but as Covington County had been renamed "Jones County" the same year (a change that lasted only a few months), the new county was named Sanford, in honor of H. C. Sanford of Cherokee County.  On February 8, 1877, the county was renamed Lamar in honor of Congressman and Senator L.Q.C. Lamar of Mississippi.

Geography

Adjacent counties
Marion County (north)
Fayette County (east)
Pickens County (south)
Lowndes County, Mississippi (southwest)
Monroe County, Mississippi (west)

Cemeteries
Asbury Methodist Church (2)

Pine Springs Cemetery
Blooming Grove Baptist Church Cemetery
Christian Chapel Church of Christ Cemetery
Fellowship Baptist Church Cemetery
Furnace Hill Cemetery
Kennedy Town Cemetery
Liberty Baptist Church Cemetery
Macedonia Baptist Church Cemetery
Meadow Branch Baptist Church Cemetery
Mount Olive Church of Christ Cemetery
Mt. Pisgah Baptist Church Cemetery
Old Mount Nebo Cemetery
Shiloh (Pinhook) United Methodist Church Cemetery
Sulligent City Cemetery
Vernon City Cemetery
Providence United Methodist Cemetery
Union Chapel Church Cemetery near Crossville
Morton Chapel Methodist Church Cemetery near Vernon
Fairview Church Cemetery
Lebanon United Methodist Church Cemetery
Shiloh Baptist Church Cemetery
Old Liberty Church Cemetery
South Carolina Church Cemetery near Hightogy
Springhill Cemetery near Millport
Walnut Grove Cemetery
Wesley Chapel Cemetery
Glimer Addition to Sulligent City Cemetery 
Sandlin Cemetery (just north of Sulligent on Hwy 17)

Demographics

2000 census
As of the census of 2000, there were 15,904 people, 6,468 households, and 4,715 families living in the county.  The population density was 26 people per square mile (10/km2).  There were 7,517 housing units at an average density of 12 per square mile (5/km2).  The racial makeup of the county was 86.87% White, 11.98% Black or African American, 0.11% Native American, 0.06% Asian, 0.46% from other races, and 0.51% from two or more races.  1.30% of the population were Hispanic or Latino of any race.

There were 6,468 households, out of which 31.40% had children under the age of 18 living with them, 58.60% were married couples living together, 10.90% had a female householder with no husband present, and 27.10% were non-families. 25.40% of all households were made up of individuals, and 12.10% had someone living alone who was 65 years of age or older.  The average household size was 2.43 and the average family size was 2.89.

In the county, the population was spread out, with 23.60% under the age of 18, 8.70% from 18 to 24, 27.70% from 25 to 44, 24.10% from 45 to 64, and 15.90% who were 65 years of age or older.  The median age was 38 years. For every 100 females, there were 93.40 males.  For every 100 females age 18 and over, there were 90.90 males.

The median income for a household in the county was $28,059, and the median income for a family was $33,050. Males had a median income of $30,453 versus $18,947 for females. The per capita income for the county was $14,435.  About 13.30% of families and 16.10% of the population were below the poverty line, including 19.10% of those under age 18 and 18.60% of those age 65 or over.

2010 census
As of the census of 2010, there were 14,564 people, 6,103 households, and 4,207 families living in the county. The population density was 24 people per square mile (9/km2).  There were 7,354 housing units at an average density of 12 per square mile (5/km2). The racial makeup of the county was 86.7% White, 11.3% Black or African American, 0.2% Native American, 0.0% Asian, 0.6% from other races, and 1.3% from two or more races. 1.2% of the population were Hispanic or Latino of any race.

There were 6,103 households, out of which 26.1% had children under the age of 18 living with them, 53.2% were married couples living together, 11.6% had a female householder with no husband present, and 31.1% were non-families. 28.8% of all households were made up of individuals, and 13.3% had someone living alone who was 65 years of age or older. The average household size was 2.35 and the average family size was 2.8.

In the county, the population was spread out, with 22.2% under the age of 18, 7.2% from 18 to 24, 22.5% from 25 to 44, 29.3% from 45 to 64, and 18.8% who were 65 years of age or older. The median age was 43.5 years. For every 100 females, there were 95.0 males.  For every 100 females age 18 and over, there were 99.4 males.

The median income for a household in the county was $33,887, and the median income for a family was $42,492. Males had a median income of $36,833 versus $25,125 for females. The per capita income for the county was $19,789. About 13.2% of families and 18.5% of the population were below the poverty line, including 25.2% of those under age 18 and 14.6% of those age 65 or over.

2020 census

As of the 2020 United States census, there were 13,972 people, 5,856 households, and 3,895 families residing in the county.

Media

Newspapers
The Vernon Pioneer - (1875–1878) The first newspaper published in Lamar County was The Vernon Pioneer.  The Editors and Proprietors included William R. Smith, William R. Smith Jr., Smith, McCullough & Co, Sid B. Smith, and Don R. Aldridge.
 The Vernon Clipper - (1879–1880) - Alexander Cobb as Editor and Proprietor and later Alex A. Wall as Proprietor.
The Lamar News - (1886–1887) - E. J. McNatt as Editor and Proprietor
The Sulligent Lightning
 The Vernon Courier - (1886–1890) - Alex A. Wall as Editor and Publisher, then Courier Publishing Co. (R. J. Young as Editor-in-Chief and Mollie C. Young as partner)
The Eagle-Eye (1894)
The Lamar Democrat (1896–present)
The Rural Educator (1908)
The Sulligent News (1942–1952)

Transportation

Major highways
 U.S. Highway 278
 State Route 17
 State Route 18
 State Route 19
 State Route 96

Rail
BNSF Railway
Luxapalila Valley Railroad

Government
In a 2000 referendum to repeal Alabama's constitutional prohibition of interracial marriage, Lamar County voters showed the highest rate of opposition in the state, with 65.69% opposing repeal of the provision.

Lamar County is reliably Republican at the presidential level. The last Democrat to win the county in a presidential election is Jimmy Carter, who won it by a majority in 1980.

Communities

Cities
Sulligent
Vernon (county seat)

Towns
Beaverton
Detroit
Kennedy
Millport

Unincorporated communities
Fernbank
Henson Springs
Hightogy
Kingville
Moscow

See also
National Register of Historic Places listings in Lamar County, Alabama
Properties on the Alabama Register of Landmarks and Heritage in Lamar County, Alabama

References

External links
Official website of Lamar County
Lamar County legends

 

 
1877 establishments in Alabama
Counties of Appalachia
Populated places established in 1877